Wentworth is an unincorporated community in Van Zandt County, Texas, United States. According to the Handbook of Texas, the community had a population of 32 in 2000. It is located within the Dallas/Fort Worth Metroplex.

History
Wentworth was named for Wentworth Manning, who moved here in 1859 with his relative, William Manning, and surveyed the land. He was also a newspaper editor. Its population was 30 during the 1930s, and in 1936, there was a church, a business, and scattered houses. The population went up by two people from 1974 through 2000 and only a church remained in Wentworth in 1987. It also served as a retail center for farmers.

Geography

Education
Since 1949, the community has been served by the Canton Independent School District.

References

Unincorporated communities in Van Zandt County, Texas
Unincorporated communities in Texas